Odmark or Ödmark is a surname. Notable people with the surname include:

Åke Ödmark (1916–1994), Swedish high jumper
Matt Odmark (born 1974), American musician